Armida, born Armida Vendrell, (29 May 1911 – 23 October 1989) was a Mexican actress, singer, dancer and vaudevillian born in Aguascalientes, Mexico.

Early life
Armida came from a theatrical family; her mother Maria Camalich, her father Joaquin Vendrell was a well known magician "The Great Arnold" who emigrated to Mexico from Barcelona, Spain. She also had two sisters that were performers as well, Lydia Vendrell and Lola Vendrell. By the time she reached the age of nineteen she had a lucrative, long-term screen contract. She purchased a beautiful home where she lived with her family. She aspired to send her younger sisters to college.

Vendrell was just five feet tall with high heels and two inches less without them. Armida had a tiny face with two dark eyes of radiant beauty. She spoke quickly, without pausing. As a small child she spoke Spanish only.

Vaudeville in California
Armida started performing at a young age, when her family moved from Mexico to the United States, her father opened the first movie theater in Douglas, Arizona. She and her sisters would sing and dance during intermission and her father would perform an illusionist act.

Armida was discovered in the old Hidalgo theater in the Plaza in Los Angeles. The Plaza was the oldest section of the city. Armida was appearing in a small, home-manufactured vaudeville skit, along with her sister Delores. A talent scout for a coastal vaudeville circuit was in the audience and offered her a chance to perform four shows a day, known as a "four-a-day". Armida progressed from the drama marts of the Plaza to various Broadway productions after being discovered by Gus Edwards, stage and screen actor, songwriter, and dance instructor. She participated in as many as twenty-four vaudeville numbers a day while in New York. Edwards brought her back to Hollywood with him and began to feature her in colortone novelties. Gus once said of Armida, that she possessed "the emotional temperament of an actress capable of surmounting the most difficult of histrionic roles".

Film career

The young Mexican actress was a success and soon progressed into short subjects in the films and was under contract to United Artists. Her first film of note featured her in a role opposite actor John Barrymore. By the time she was eighteen, Warner Brothers offered her a five year-contract. In On the Border (1930) Vendrell played Pepita, a Spanish girl. She is protected from the leader of a band of desperadoes by her lover and her pet dog, Rin-Tin-Tin. The story was an exciting one about Chinese people being smuggled over the Mexican border into the United States.

Armida appeared in films like Border Romance (1929), The Show of Shows (1929), General Crack (1930), Under a Texas Moon (1930), The Marines Are Coming (1934), Under the Pampas Moon (1935), Patio Serenade (1938), Machine Gun Mama (1944), Bad Men of the Border (1945), Congo Bill (1948) and The Gay Amigo (1949). Her final role was in Rhythm Inn (1951), in which she played a specialty dancer.  She also appeared with Gene Autry in the western  Rootin' Tootin' Rhythm (1937). One of her few leading roles was in The Girl from Monterrey. She also made a notable appearance on Broadway with Nina Rosa (1930–31).

Filmography

 Rhythm Inn (1951) .....specialty dancer
 The Gay Amigo (1949) ..... Rosita
 Congo Bill (1948) ..... Zalea
 Jungle Goddess (1948) ..... Wanama
 Cuban Madness (1946) ..... Armida
 Bad Men of the Border (1945) ..... Dolores Mendoza
 South of the Rio Grande (1945) ..... Pepita
 Machine Gun Mama (1944) ..... Nita
 Here Comes Kelly (1943)
 Melody Parade (1943) ..... Armida
 The Girl from Monterrey (1943) ..... Lita Valdez
 Always in My Heart (1942) ..... Lolita
 Fiesta (1941) ..... Cuca
 South of Tahiti (1941) ..... Putara
 Out Where the Stars Begin (1941) (short film) .... Herself
 La Conga Nights (1940)
 Patio Serenade (1938)
 Rootin' Tootin' Rhythm (1937)
 Border Cafe (1937) as Dominga
 Under the Pampas Moon (1935)
 The Marines Are Coming (1934)
 General Crack (1930)
 Under a Texas Moon (1930)
 On the Border (1930) as Pepita
 Wings of Adventure (1930)
 The Show of Shows (1929)
 Border Romance (1929)
 Smiling Billy (1927)

Death
Armida Vendrell died in Victorville, California, on October 23, 1989, of a heart attack.

Notes

References

Further reading
Bedford, Pennsylvania Gazette, Theatre Activities, May 23, 1930, Page 10.
Charleston, West Virginia Gazette, Cinderella Story, Sunday, September 22, 1929, Page 7.
Los Angeles Times, Armida Is Gay, Young Discovery, October 21, 1928, Page B13.
Los Angeles Times, Wave Of Popularity Sweeping Mexican Stars To Top Goes Marching On, January 27, 1929, Page C11
 Dye, David. Child and Youth Actors: Filmography of Their Entire Careers, 1914-1985. Jefferson, NC: McFarland & Co., 1988, p. 7.

External links

 
 Findagrave for Armida Vendrell

1911 births
1989 deaths
Vaudeville performers
American people of Spanish descent
Mexican emigrants to the United States
20th-century American actresses
20th-century Mexican actresses
People from Victorville, California
American actresses of Mexican descent